Amores Verdaderos (English: True Love) is a Mexican telenovela produced by Nicandro Díaz González for Televisa and premiered by Canal de las Estrellas in September 2012. It is based on the Argentine telenovela Amor en custodia. It stars Erika Buenfil, Eduardo Yáñez, Eiza González and Sebastián Rulli.

Plot
The story begins when Victoria Balvanera (Erika Buenfil), owner of large lands and a prestigious advertising agency, suffers an attempted kidnapping on the family farm; José Ángel (Eduardo Yáñez), who comes to request the position of foreman for her, saves her from the criminals. After this altercation, Victoria decides to hire José Ángel as her bodyguard, but the time shared and the daily dealings will cause a true love to emerge between them, but impossible to confess because they are both married.

Victoria is the wife of Nelson Brizz (Guillermo Capetillo), who married her only for her interest, from this marriage a daughter, Nicole (Eiza González), was born; She is a capricious and haughty young woman who keeps her serious problem of bulimia and anorexia a secret. Nicole adores her parents and her grandfather Aníbal (Enrique Rocha), a regal, domineering and shrewd man who manipulates the lives of her daughters Victoria and Adriana (Natalia Esperón).

Victoria is married to Nelson, but when she discovers that he has a mistress and she is going to have a child from him, she requests a divorce from her, but he refuses to give it to her; on the other hand, José Ángel suffers the loss of his wife Cristina (Mónika Sánchez), who died in an accident shortly after learning that she was the daughter of Aníbal Balvanera and was the result of the relationship that her mother had with him some time ago.

Liliana (Sherlyn González), who is Cristina's daughter, suffers the loss of her supposed mother without actually knowing that her real mother is Adriana. Liliana arrives to work as a gardener at the Balvanera mansion where she has to endure the rudeness and mistreatment of Nicole who insists on making a difference between them, however, this will come to an end when Liliana discovers that she is also a Balvanera and she will gain strength to fight Nicole for the love of Francisco (Sebastián Rulli), who has come in as Nicole's personal bodyguard, putting Liliana at a disadvantage to win her love. Nicole, on her part, will do everything possible to make Francisco's life miserable without knowing that she will ultimately fall in love with him madly.

As a result of a series of misunderstandings, Nicole marries Rogelio (Eleazar Gómez) without love believing that Francisco loves Liliana, Rogelio accepts the marriage following the instructions of his mother, since they see in Nicole the only possibility to get out of the family ruin, giving as It turned out to be hell for both of us. For her part, Francisco is forced to marry Liliana after a tragic event that left her in agony, a fact that deeply hurts Nicole, because when they meet again and after her separation with Rogelio, they both realize that they still love each other. Victoria, José Ángel, Nicole and Francisco will have to overcome the obstacles of destiny that will be the only one in charge of uniting them and achieving their True Love.

Cast
The main cast of the series was confirmed on June 22, 2012.

Main
 Erika Buenfil as Victoria Balvanera
 Eduardo Yáñez as José Ángel Arriaga
 Eiza González as Nikki Brizz Balvanera
 Sebastián Rulli as Francisco Guzmán

Recurring
 Enrique Rocha as Aníbal Balvanera
 Guillermo Capetillo as Nelsón Brizz
 Marjorie de Sousa as Kendra Ferreti/Macária Chávez
 Sherlyn as Liliana Arriaga/ Lucia Celorio Balvanera
 Francisco Gattorno as Santino Roca "Salsero"
 Mónika Sánchez as Cristina Corona de Arriaga
 Susana González as Beatriz Guzmán
 Julio Camejo as Leonardo Solís
 Raquel Morell as Tomasina Lagos
 Silvia Manríquez as Paula Trejo
 Michelle Rodríguez as Polita
 Ruben Branco as Jean Marie
 Lilia Aragón as Odette Longoria
 Archie Lafranco as Estefano Longoria
 Arsenio Campos as Felipe Guzmán
 Diana Golden as Gilda
 Sergio Acosta as Espanto
 Toño Infante as Comandante 
 Hugo Macías Macotela as Fortuno
 Natalia Esperón as Adriana Balvanera
 Ana Martin as Candelaria Corona

Guest starts
 Marcelo Córdoba as Vicente Celorio
 Ana Bárbara as Herself
 Elsa Cárdenas as Jueza

Production
Principal photography of Amores verdaderos officially started on July 23, 2012 and concluded on April 30, 2013. It is also the first telenovela to have 3-hour finale presentation with commercials.

Episodes

Reception

Mexican broadcast
On September 3, 2012, Canal de las Estrellas started broadcasting Amores verdaderos weeknights at 9:30pm, replacing Abismo de pasión. The last episode was broadcast on May 12, 2013, with La tempestad replacing it the following day.

U.S. broadcast
Univision confirmed a prime-time broadcast of Amores verdaderos on October 10, 2012. On November 7, Univision started broadcasting Amores verdaderos weeknights at 9pm/8c, replacing Abismo de pasión averaged 4.3 million viewers. The last episode was broadcast on July 28, 2013 at 8pm/7c, with La tempestad replacing it the following day, averaged 5.3 million viewers.

Awards and nominations

References

External links

2012 telenovelas
2010s LGBT-related drama television series
2010s Mexican television series
2012 Mexican television series debuts
2013 Mexican television series endings
Televisa telenovelas
Mexican telenovelas
Mexican television series based on Argentine television series
Spanish-language telenovelas
Television shows set in Mexico
Television shows set in Mexico City
Same-sex marriage in television
Mexican LGBT-related television shows